Airplane II: The Sequel (titled Flying High II: The Sequel in Australia, New Zealand, South Africa, Japan, and the Philippines) is a 1982 American parody film written and directed by Ken Finkleman in his directorial debut and starring Robert Hays, Julie Hagerty, Lloyd Bridges, Chad Everett, William Shatner, Rip Torn, and Sonny Bono. A sequel to the 1980 film Airplane!, it was released on December 10, 1982.

The team who wrote and directed the original Airplane! (Jim Abrahams, David Zucker, and Jerry Zucker) had no involvement with this sequel. Paramount, having faced a similar situation with Grease 2 earlier in that year, hired Finkleman, who wrote Grease 2, to write and direct Airplane II as well.

Plot
In the near future, the Moon has been colonized and supports a station on its surface. A lunar shuttle known as Mayflower One is being rushed to launch from Houston. The head of the ground crew, The Sarge, does not like what is occurring, but he defers to airline management.

On the flight crew are Captain Clarence Oveur, navigator/co-pilot Unger, and first officer/flight engineer Dunn. Also on board is computer officer Elaine Dickinson. Having dumped Ted Striker, Elaine is now engaged to Simon Kurtz, a member of the flight crew, and Ted has been committed to an insane asylum. He was declared mentally incompetent in a lawsuit following a test flight that Ted piloted and in which the lunar shuttle crashed. Ted believes the lawsuit was meant to silence him regarding dangerous safety issues related to the lunar shuttle. He is again haunted by his actions in "The War" – specifically the loss of his entire squadron above "Macho Grande" – resulting in a relapse of his "drinking problem". When Ted learns of the lunar shuttle's upcoming launch, he escapes the asylum and buys a ticket for the flight.

During the flight, Mayflower One suffers a short circuit, causing the artificially intelligent computer, ROK, to go insane and send the ship toward the Sun. Unger and Dunn try to deactivate the computer, but are blown out of an airlock. Oveur tries to stop ROK, but the computer gasses him. Simon abandons Elaine and leaves in the sole escape pod. Once again, Ted is called upon to save the day, but he must first figure out how to wrest control of the shuttle from the computer. Air traffic controller Steve McCroskey reveals that passenger Joe Seluchi had boarded with a bomb in a briefcase, intent on committing suicide to provide an insurance payout for his wife. Ted manages to wrestle the bomb from Joe, uses it to blow up ROK, and sets course for the Moon as originally intended.

The computer's destruction results in collateral damage to the shuttle; the flight is not yet out of danger. En route to the Moon, flight control shifts to a lunar base under the command of Commander Buck Murdock. Contemptuous of Ted because of Macho Grande, he nonetheless agrees to help and they manage to land the craft safely on the Moon. Ted and Elaine fall back in love and are married at the end. After the wedding, Joe looks into the cockpit and asks for his briefcase back.

A post-credit message – "Coming from Paramount Pictures: Airplane III" – inspires Murdock to remark, "That's exactly what they'll be expecting us to do!"

Cast

Production 
Most of the first film’s cast agreed to return for the film while Jerry Zucker, Jim Abrahams, and David Zucker were involved in the early stages of development. However, Abrahams and the Zuckers decided to make the television series Police Squad! instead, and publicly distanced themselves from the sequel during its marketing.

Filming began June 2, 1982, in Los Angeles and lasted eight weeks, with double the budget of the first film.

Reception
On review aggregator website Rotten Tomatoes, the film holds an approval rating of 42% based on 19 reviews, with an average rating of 5.3/10. On Metacritic, the film has a weighted average score of 48 out of 100 based on nine critics, indicating "mixed or average reviews".

Variety remarked, "It can't be said that Airplane II is no better or worse than its predecessor. It is far worse, but might seem funnier had there been no original". Roger Ebert gave the film two out of four stars, saying it "never really seems to know whether it's about a spaceship. It's all sight gags, one-liners, puns, funny signs and scatological cross-references".

Airplane II opened in the United States the same weekend as The Toy and 48 Hrs. and finished second for the weekend behind The Toy with a gross of $5,329,208 from 1,150 screens. Grosses dropped 45% the following week and the film went on to earn only $27.2 million in the United States and Canada, compared to the original's $83 million box office total.

References

External links

 
 
 
 

1982 films
1980s science fiction comedy films
1980s disaster films
1980s parody films
American aviation films
American science fiction comedy films
American parody films
American sequel films
American space adventure films
1980s English-language films
Films scored by Elmer Bernstein
Films about astronauts
Films directed by Ken Finkleman
Films produced by Howard W. Koch
Films set in the future
Films set on airplanes
Moon in film
Paramount Pictures films
Films with screenplays by Ken Finkleman
American slapstick comedy films
1982 comedy films
1982 directorial debut films
1980s American films